Jon Winston Ackerson (born 1943) is a former member of the Kentucky House of Representatives, and the Kentucky Senate.

References

1943 births
Living people
Republican Party members of the Kentucky House of Representatives
Republican Party Kentucky state senators
Louisville Metro Council members
Politicians from Louisville, Kentucky
Kentucky lawyers
University of Indianapolis alumni
University of Louisville School of Law alumni